DYXC (107.1 FM), broadcasting as  107.1 Radyo Natin, is a radio station owned and operated by Manila Broadcasting Company. The station's studio is located at the 2nd Floor, Ormoc Centrum Bldg., Aviles St., Ormoc.

References

Contemporary hit radio stations in the Philippines
Radio stations established in 2003
Radio stations in Leyte (province)
Radyo Natin Network stations